The Tibetan shrew (Sorex thibetanus) is a species of mammal in the family Soricidae. It is found in western China.

References

Sorex
Taxonomy articles created by Polbot
Mammals described in 1905